Duplarius (plural duplares), duplicarius or dupliciarius, was an inferior, low-ranking Roman officer, who received double rations or increased payment valuing the 2nd ration based on their valor. As part of cavalry, one decurio, one duplicarius, and one sesquiplarius was assigned to one turma. Each duplarius as part of a turma was allowed to have two horses. Golden-badged duplares were named Torquati duplares.

See also

 List of Roman army unit types

References

Ancient Roman titles
Military ranks of ancient Rome